Hai paura del buio? is the fourth studio album by Italian Alternative Rock band Afterhours. Like its predecessor, Germi, Hai paura del buio? features only Italian language. The album is also considered by fans Afterhours' best work.

Track listing
 "Hai paura del buio?" – 0:34     
 "1.9.9.6." – 3:41     
 "Male di miele" – 2:43     
 "Rapace" – 5:36     
 "Elymania" – 3:37     
 "Pelle" – 5:10     
 "Dea" – 1:40     
 "Senza finestra" – 2:46     
 "Simbiosi" – 4:13     
 "Voglio una pelle splendida" – 3:41
 "Terrorswing" – 2:49     
 "Lasciami leccare l'adrenalina" – 1:18     
 "Punto G" – 5:44     
 "Veleno" – 3:45     
 "Come vorrei" – 3:06     
 "Questo pazzo pazzo mondo di tasse" – 2:59     
 "Musicista contabile" – 5:30     
 "Sui giovani d'oggi ci scatarro su" – 2:57     
 "Mi trovo nuovo" – 3:39

All songs composed by Afterhours.

Credits
 Manuel Agnelli − vocals
 Xabier Iriondo Gemmi − lead guitar, rhythm guitar
 Dario Ciffo − violin
 Alessandro Zerilli − bass guitar
 Giorgio Prette − drums

Charts

References

1997 albums
Afterhours (band) albums